Mildred Breed (born 1947) is an American bridge player. Breed is from Austin, Texas.

Bridge accomplishments

Wins

 North American Bridge Championships (16)
 Rockwell Mixed Pairs (1) 2007 
 Smith Life Master Women's Pairs (4) 1999, 2000, 2001, 2002 
 Machlin Women's Swiss Teams (3) 1999, 2003, 2006 
 Wagar Women's Knockout Teams (4) 1997, 2006, 2007, 2012 
 Sternberg Women's Board-a-Match Teams (4) 1994, 1998, 2000, 2002

Runners-up

 North American Bridge Championships
 Whitehead Women's Pairs (2) 1984, 1999 
 Smith Life Master Women's Pairs (1) 2005 
 Machlin Women's Swiss Teams (2) 2004, 2012 
 Wagar Women's Knockout Teams (3) 2000, 2010, 2011 
 Sternberg Women's Board-a-Match Teams (2) 1997, 2003 
 Chicago Mixed Board-a-Match (1) 2003

References 

Living people
American contract bridge players
1947 births
Place of birth missing (living people)
Date of birth missing (living people)
Sportspeople from Austin, Texas